Valiant Lady is an American radio soap opera that was broadcast on ABC, CBS, and NBC at various times from March 7, 1938, through August 23, 1946, and later between October 8, 1951, and February 19, 1952.

Characteristics
Episodes of Valiant Lady were introduced with the summary: "... the story of a woman and her brilliant but unstable husband -- the story of her struggle to keep his feet firmly planted on the pathway to success." The main character was "an actress who relinquishes her career to marry Truman Scott, a noted plastic surgeon." Because "Truman was extremely jealous and unstable," the story centered on "efforts to guide his life."

A 1946 article in the trade publication Broadcasting noted:

Joan Blaine, the program's star for most of its time on the air, wrote in a 1942 Pittsburgh Press article:

In a 1943 article in The Milwaukee Journal, Blaine commented that Valiant Lady "deals with current issues — all substantial contemporary material."

Origin
Valiant Lady was created by Frank and Anne Hummert. General Mills test-marketed the program on WGN in Chicago, Illinois, beginning January 3, 1938. An article in a trade publication noted that the tentative title Magnificent Lady had been changed to the permanent title Valiant Lady. Initial cast members were Joan Blaine, Francis X. Bushman, Sally Agnes Smith and Olan Soule. The author was Sandra Michaels.

Networks
Beginning March 7, 1938, after two months of testing on WGN, Valiant Lady was moved to CBS to be broadcast "five mornings weekly," replacing Hollywood in Person as part of the Gold Medal Hour. The 15-minute program continued to originate in Chicago.

On May 30, 1938, General Mills moved Valiant Lady and four other programs from CBS to NBC. By that time, Valiant Lady was originating from New York City. General Mills ended its sponsorship of the Valiant Lady and Light of the World effective August 23, 1946, citing "government restrictions on wheat and labor difficulties"; the programs advertised Gold Medal Flour and Cheerios, respectively. An article in a trade publication estimated, "Cancellation means a $1,000,000 loss in billing for CBS."

Personnel
Joan Blaine was the star, playing "an actress with a wide assortment of personal problems" who gave up her acting career to care for her injured father. The character's name is given in various old-time radio reference works as Joan Blake, Joan Barrett, Joan Scott, and Joan Hargrave-Scott. Blaine's importance to the program was such that she received "billing up front before the title."

The program's characters and the actors and actresses who played them are as follows. (Source except as noted.)

Others who acted in the program over the years included Vivian Holt, Sue Reed, Richard Sanders, Florence Malone, Barbara Lee, Arthur Elmer, Gilbert Mack, Roy Fant, Ray Morgan, Louise Larabee, Jackson Beck, Howard St. John, George Herman, and Aileen Poe.

Announcers were Art Millet and Dwight Weist, and the organists were Jesse Crawford and Theodore Wick.

Directors were Ted Corday, Basil Loughrane, Roy Lockwood, Ernest Ricca, and Rikel Kent. Writers were Sandra Michael, Ruth Borden, Addy Richton, Lynn Stone, Lawrence Klee, and Howard Teichman. Laughrane was also the producer for part of the program's run. Other producers were Dan Sutter and Wynn Orr.

References

External links
Episodic log of Valiant Lady from Calfkiller Old Time Radio
Episodic log of Valiant Lady from Jerry Haendiges Vintage Radio Logs
Episodic log of Valiant Lady from radioGOLDINdex

American radio soap operas
1938 radio programme debuts
1946 radio programme endings
1951 radio programme debuts
1952 radio programme endings
1940s American radio programs
1930s American radio programs
CBS Radio programs
Programs